Muhidin Teskeredžić (born 2 July 1958 in Rogatica, SR Bosnia, FPR Yugoslavia) is a Bosnian retired footballer.

Club career
He passed the youth ranks of local club Mladost Rogatica and eventually signed with lower-tier side Iskra Sarajevo in 1978. After three seasons with Iskra he moved to FK Sarajevo where he won the Yugoslav First League title in 1985. He went on to play for Austrian sides Sturm Graz and Admira Wacker before moving back to FK Sarajevo, where he retired from professional football in 1991.

References

1958 births
Living people
People from Rogatica
Association football forwards
Yugoslav footballers
FK Sarajevo players
SK Sturm Graz players
FC Admira Wacker Mödling players
Yugoslav First League players
Austrian Football Bundesliga players
Yugoslav expatriate footballers
Expatriate footballers in Austria
Yugoslav expatriate sportspeople in Austria